Paul à Québec ("Paul in Quebec City") is a Canadian drama film from Quebec, directed by François Bouvier and released in 2015.

Based on Michel Rabagliati's graphic novel of the same title, the film stars François Létourneau and Julie Le Breton as Paul and Lucie, a happily-married couple struggling to cope with Lucie's father Roland's (Gilbert Sicotte) diagnosis with terminal pancreatic cancer. The cast also includes Louise Portal, Bobby Beshro, Brigitte Lafleur, Myriam LeBlanc, Julien Poulin, Mathieu Quesnel, Patrice Robitaille, Geneviève Schmidt, Nathaly Thibault, Jasmine Lemée and Karine Vanasse.

Rabagliati originally approached Bouvier about adapting either Paul à Québec or Paul a un travail d'été for film, because he was a fan of Bouvier's earlier film Winter Stories (Histoires d'hiver). Around the same time as that personal contact, Karine Vanasse and Nathalie Brigitte Bustos, two of the film's producers, approached La Pastèque, Rabagliati's publisher, to inquire about optioning film rights to Paul à Quebec.

Sicotte won the Québec Cinéma award for Best Actor at the 18th Quebec Cinema Awards.

References

External links
 

2015 films
2015 drama films
Canadian drama films
Films directed by François Bouvier
Films about cancer
Films based on Canadian comics
Live-action films based on comics
French-language Canadian films
2010s Canadian films